56th Regiment of Foot may refer to:

54th (West Norfolk) Regiment of Foot, 56th Regiment of Foot, raised in 1755 and renumbered as the 54th in 1756
56th (West Essex) Regiment of Foot, raised in 1755 as the 58th and renumbered as the 56th in 1756